The 1898 Sheriff of London Charity Shield was the first edition of the Sheriff of London Charity Shield. The match and subsequent replay were both drawn and hence the honour was shared between Corinthian and Sheffield United.

Match

Background  

The contest was proposed by Sir Thomas Dewar who was a Sheriff of London in 1897 and part of the organising committee. Sheffield United F.C. were league champions for the first time in their history in the 1897–98 Football League and Corinthian were the premier amateur side of the time providing many of the England national football team players.

Prior to the match, Dewar offered to present 15 carat gold medals of an appropriate design to each member of the winning team, coupled with badges of the same metal composition to the committee.

First-half
The first half was a very defensive encounter, partly due to the wet pitch. The referee Mr E.E. Stuart pulled up players from both sides for a large number of fouls. Corinthians were mostly forced into their own half for the initial period of the game due to the brilliant performances of Sheffield's Needham, Morren and Johnson at half-back.

Second-half
The second half saw more attacking play with strong showings from Corinthian's Smith and Burnup, however, the Sheffield backs Thickett and Cain were their match defensively.

Details

Replay

Background
The sides were largely unchanged with two changes for each to the initial lineups. Topham and W. L. Foster came in for Corinthian replacing Stanborough and Ingram. For Sheffield United, forwards Almond and Hedley replaced McKay and Gaudie.

First-half
Sheffield United scored first with a goal from their forward Almond following a pass from Cunningham. Sheffield appeared content after scoring their goal a few minutes before the end of the first half, due to a strong defensive showing.

Second-half
Fifteen minutes into the second half, Corinthian's Topham was fouled near the goal mouth and a free kick resulted in a goal scored by W. L. Foster after a retake for encroachment. The game was again a strong defensive showing from both sides and at the end of 90 minutes Sheffield United refused to play extra time, alleging unfairness shown by the referee as an excuse, resulting in the honour being shared.

Post match
The play was described as not being particularly exciting, attributed to players being "evidently stale" following the original match the week before.

Details

References

Sheriff of London Charity Shield
Sheriff of London Charity Shield 1898
Sheriff of London Charity Shield 1898
Sheriff of London Charity Shield
Sheriff of London Charity Shield
Sheriff of London Charity Shield